La Zizanie is a 1978 French comedy film directed by Claude Zidi, written by Zidi and Michel Fabre, and starring Louis de Funès and Annie Girardot. The English title is The Spat.

Plot
Guillaume Daubray-Lacaze (Louis de Funès), an industrialist in depolluting materials and systems, has signed a contract with a japanese enterprise to order 3000 of his CX-22 machines, saving his business from bankruptcy. However, his workers quickly make him realise that he doesn't have enough space to store and create the new CX-22. Realising his mistake, Daubray-Lacaze starts invading the house with all sorts of machines, and even placing workers in his bedroom. His wife, Bernadette (Annie Girardot) tries to ignore these inconveniences, but breaks after her husband destroys her whole garden to store his machines. Furious, she quits Guillaume, and presents herself to the municipal elections against her own husband.

Cast 
 Louis de Funès as Guillaume Daubray-Lacaze
 Annie Girardot as Bernadette Daubray-Lacaze
 Maurice Risch as the imbecile
 Jean-Jacques Moreau as the foreman
 Geneviève Fontanel as Madame Berger
 Jacques François as the prefect
 Georges Staquet as the union representative
 Mario David as the lorry driver

References

External links
 
 
 
 La Zizanie (1978) at the Films de France

1978 films
1978 comedy films
Films directed by Claude Zidi
French comedy films
1970s French-language films
1970s French films